Thadingyut is the seventh month of the traditional Burmese calendar.
Myanmar term "thadin" (သီတင်း) means the Buddhist Lent (Vassa), which spans the three preceding lunar months and is the tradition of Buddhist monks trying to avoid traveling as Buddha instructed them. The combination "thadingyut" means the liberation from or the end of the Lent.

Festivals and observances
Full Moon of Thadingyut - end of the Buddhist lent
Abhidhamma Day
Festival of Lights
Yay Gyaw Festival (Pazundaung Township, Yangon)
Pagoda festivals
Myathalun Pagoda Festival (Magwe Region)
Hpaung Daw U Pagoda Festival (Shan State)

Thadingyut symbols
Flower: Nelumbo nucifera

See also
Burmese calendar
Festivals of Burma
Kyaukse elephant dance festival
Vassa

References

Months of the Burmese calendar